Pavan Choudary (born 29 August 1965) is an Indian writer, TV talk-show host, TEDx speaker, and CEO. He has written several books including How a Good Person can Really Win (Earlier version- When you are sinking become a submarine- Winning Through Wisdom and Creativity), Machiavelli for Moral People, Broom and Groom (co-author Kiran Bedi) and The Rx Factor.

Choudary also hosts the TV show Hum Aisey Kyun Hain on Doordarshan and has written columns for The Times of India (Gurgaon), the Financial Chronicle and Firstpost. He is the managing director of Vygon India, a French multinational company.

Personal life
Choudary was born on 29 August 1965 in Sagar, Madhya Pradesh, India. He received his education at Bal Bharti Air Force School Delhi and St. Joseph Convent School, Sagar, Madhya Pradesh. He obtained graduation in Pharmacy honours from Sagar University and MBA from Shimla University. He is married to his college friend Anu Choudary.

Career

Early career 
Choudary began his career joining the Jagsonpal Pharmaceuticals in 1988, switched to advertising field and again came back to the pharmaceutical sector, in Cadila Pharmaceuticals. Later he joined the Indian multinational, Dabur Pharmaceuticals as a Marketing Manager.

CEO and managing director 
Pavan is the CEO and managing director of Vygon India Pvt. Ltd., a leading French Multinational company in Healthcare. When he joined Vygon in 1997, he was amongst the youngest CEOs to head a multinational in India. He is also an active member of the worldwide strategy planning effort of Vygon and spearheads Vygon's M&A initiative in India.

Author 
Choudary writes on wisdom and on different subjects including Social reforms. His recent book, How a Good Person can Really Win (Earlier version- When you are sinking become a submarine- Winning Through Wisdom and Creativity) describes how a principled man can win against an unprincipled person through wisdom and creativity. His book, The Rx Factor – Strategic Creativity in Pharmaceutical Marketing is a seminal work on marketing and strategy in healthcare. Pavan's books have also been translated into Hindi, Marathi, Gujarati, Bengali, Tamil, Kannada, Telugu and Malayalam.

He co-authored two books with Kiran Bedi; Broom & Groom – a classic on Hygiene and manners for a social renaissance of civil behaviour, and Uprising 2011: Indians Against Corruption – an assembled chronicle of the civil-society supported anti-corruption movement in India.

Success Sutras for the 21st Century: A Trilogy of Wisdom (Set of 3 Hardback books – Chanakya's Political Wisdom, Kabir's Spiritual Wisdom and Confucius’ Social Wisdom) is a political, social and spiritual commentary by Choudary that describes how to achieve Political sharpness, Social order and Spiritual bliss for the common man as well as for the statesman/politician.

TV Host and Columnist 
Pavan hosts the nation-building TV program on social and civic reform Hum Aisey Kyun Hain on Doordarshan and writes a popular column (at present in recess) for The Times of India on civic reform.

Teaching 
Pavan has lectured at the Indian Institutes of Management (IIM) at Ahmedabad, Lucknow and Kozhikode; the Sardar Vallabh Bhai Patel National Police Academy, Hyderabad; the Lal Bahadur Shastri National Academy of Administration, Mussoorie; Sydney Technical University; Singapore Management University and other prestigious institutes in India and abroad. He has also addressed the senior management of several leading companies from across the world.

Bibliography
 The Rx Factor – Strategic Creativity in Pharmaceutical Marketing, Sage Publications, 1997: , Hardcover: , Paperback: , New edition, Wisdom Village Publications: 
 When you are Sinking become a Submarine, Wisdom Tree, 2007, New edition, Wisdom Village Publications, 2006, 
 Success Sutras for the 21st Century: A Trilogy of Wisdom, Wisdom Village Publications, 2009, 
 Chanakya's Political Wisdom, Wisdom Village Publications, 2009, 
 Kabir's Spiritual Wisdom, Wisdom Village Publications, 2009, 
 Confucius' Social Wisdom, Wisdom Village Publications, 2009, 
 Broom & Groom (co-author Kiran Bedi), Wisdom Village Publications, 2010, 
 Machiavelli for Moral People, Wisdom Village Publications, 2012, 
 Uprising 2011 (co-author Kiran Bedi), Wisdom Village Publications, 2013, 
 How a Good Person can Really Win, Wisdom Village Publications, 2013, 
 Lal Bahadur Shastri – Lessons in Leadership, (co-author Anil Shastri) Wisdom Village Publications, 2014, 
 India Protests (co-author Kiran Bedi), Wisdom Village Publications, 2014, 
 Swachh Bharat Checklist (co-author Kiran Bedi), Wisdom Village Publications, 2015,

See also
 List of Indian writers

References

External links 
 Official website

1965 births
Corporate executives
English-language writers from India
Indian chief executives
Living people